Little Nemaha River Bridge may refer to:

Little Nemaha River Bridge (Dunbar, Nebraska), listed on the National Register of Historic Places in Otoe County, Nebraska
Little Nemaha River Bridge (Syracuse, Nebraska), listed on the National Register of Historic Places in Otoe County, Nebraska